Jorge Mandrú (born May 5, 1986 in Osorno) is an alpine skier from Chile. He competed for Chile at the 2010 Winter Olympics. Mandrú was Chile's flag bearer during the 2010 Winter Olympics opening ceremony.

References

External links 
 
 

1986 births
Living people
Chilean male alpine skiers
Olympic alpine skiers of Chile
Alpine skiers at the 2006 Winter Olympics
Alpine skiers at the 2010 Winter Olympics
People from Osorno, Chile
21st-century Chilean people